Eureptilia ("true reptiles") is one of the two major subgroups of the clade Sauropsida, the other one being Parareptilia. Eureptilia includes Diapsida (the clade containing all modern reptiles and birds), as well as a number of primitive Permo-Carboniferous forms previously classified under Anapsida, in the old (no longer recognised) order "Cotylosauria". 

Eureptilia is characterized by the skull having greatly reduced supraoccipital, tabular, and supratemporal bones that are no longer in contact with the postorbital. Aside from Diapsida, the group notably contains Captorhinidae, a diverse and long lived (Late Carboniferous-Late Permian) clade of initially small carnivores that later evolved into large herbivores. Other primitive eureptiles such as Hylonomus and "protorothyrids" were all small, superficially lizard-like forms, that were probably insectivorous. One primitive eureptile, the Late Carboniferous "protorothyrid" Anthracodromeus, is the oldest known climbing tetrapod. Diapsids were the only eureptilian clade to continue beyond the end of the Permian.

Classification
Eureptilia was defined as a stem-based clade, specifically, the most inclusive clade containing Captorhinus aguti and Petrolacosaurus kansensis but not Procolophon trigoniceps, by Tsuji and Müller (2009). The cladogram here was modified after Muller and Reisz (2006):

References

External links
 Eureptilia examples of some Permian species
 Eureptilia

 
Tetrapod unranked clades
Extant Pennsylvanian first appearances
Taxa named by Everett C. Olson